Roche ester (methyl 3-hydroxy-2-methylpropionate) is a chemical compound with formula C5H10O3. It can exist as two enantiomers. Both are commercially available and have been widely used as starting blocks for the synthesis of many targets including dictyostatin, discodermolide and spongidepsin.

References

External links 
R-(−)-Roche ester at Chemical Book

Methyl esters